Thiago Tremonti   (born 8 June 1985) is a football midfielder from Brazil.

He had formerly played for Pandurii Târgu Jiu in Romanian League Liga I.

External links
Official site profile 
futebolusa.com

1985 births
Living people
Brazilian footballers
Brazilian expatriate footballers
Brazilian people of Italian descent
Association football midfielders
Expatriate footballers in Romania
Paulista Futebol Clube players
Grêmio Barueri Futebol players
CS Pandurii Târgu Jiu players
Liga I players
People from Ribeirão Preto
Footballers from São Paulo (state)